Reconstruction may refer to:

Politics, history, and sociology
Reconstruction (law), the transfer of a company's (or several companies') business to a new company
Perestroika (Russian for "reconstruction"), a late 20th century Soviet Union political movement
Critical reconstruction, an architectural theory related to the reconstruction of Berlin after the end of the Berlin Wall
Economic reconstruction
Ministry of Reconstruction, a UK government department
The Reconstruction era of the United States, the period after the Civil War, 1865–1877
 The Reconstruction Acts, or Military Reconstruction Acts, addressing requirements for Southern States to be readmitted to the Union
Reconstruction Finance Corporation, a United States government agency from 1932–1957

Arts, entertainment, and media

Films
Reconstruction (1968 film), a Romanian tragicomedy
Reconstruction (2001 film), about the 1959 Ioanid Gang bank heist in Romania
Reconstruction (2003 film), a Danish psychological romantic drama

Music
Reconstruction (band), featuring Jerry Garcia, Nick Kahner and John Kahn
Reconstruction (Hugh Masekela album), 1970
Reconstruction (Max Romeo album), 1977
Reconstructions (Don Diablo album)
Reconstructions (Kerry Livgren album)

Television
"Reconstruction" (Jericho episode)
Red vs. Blue: Reconstruction, a machinima comedy series

Other uses in arts, entertainment, and media
Reconstruction (magazine), a monthly edited by Allan L. Benson from 1919 to 1921
ReConStruction, a 2010 science fiction convention
Memorial reconstruction, a hypothesis regarding the transcription of 17th-century plays

Science and computing
3D reconstruction in computer vision
Ancestral reconstruction, the analysis of organisms' relationships via genome data
Cone beam reconstruction, a computational microtomography method
Crime reconstruction
Event reconstruction, the interpretation of signals from a particle detector
Forensic facial reconstruction, the process of recreating the face of an individual from its skeletal remains
Iterative reconstruction, methods to construct images of objects
Reconstruction algorithm, an algorithm used in iterative reconstruction
Reconstruction conjecture, in graph theory
Reconstructive plastic surgery
Shooting reconstruction
Signal reconstruction, the determination of an original continuous signal from samples
Single particle reconstruction, the combination of multiple images of molecules to produce a three-dimensional image
Surface reconstruction, the process which alters atomic structure in crystal surfaces
Tomographic reconstruction
Vector field reconstruction, the creation of a vector field from experimental data

Other uses
3D sound reconstruction
Reconstruction (architecture), the act of rebuilding a destroyed structure
Linguistic reconstruction

See also
Reconstructionism (disambiguation)
Doctor Who missing episodes§Reconstruction
Deconstruction